Mojave Phone Booth is an independently produced 2006 film directed by John Putch. The film is based on a real phone booth in the Mojave Desert that once accepted incoming calls, but has since been removed.

The film is composed of the intertwined stories of four Las Vegas people whose lives are each connected by the vandalized but functioning Mojave phone booth. An isolated structure in the desert, some 15 miles from the nearest highway and miles from any other building, the booth became an internet phenomenon in 1997. The movie portrays the stories of four fictional travelers, separately drawn to visit the booth in the hopes the phone there might suddenly ring, allowing them to randomly connect with a stranger (this type of pilgrimage was actually practiced by many people prior to the real booth being removed on May 17, 2000 by Pacific Bell).

The travelers are Beth, who is trying to resolve problems with her love-life, as well as a mysterious, recurring crime; Mary, who is considering resorting to prostitution to escape the depressing circumstances of her life; Alex, a woman who is losing her lover, Glory, to a belief she is plagued by aliens; and Richard, an alcoholic, severely depressed by being separated from his wife, who chances upon the booth after the failure of his suicide attempt.

Cast
Annabeth Gish as Beth
Steve Guttenberg as Barry
Christine Elise as Alex
Tinarie Van Wyk-Loots as Mary
Robert Romanus as Richard
David DeLuise as Michael
Missi Pyle as Sarah
Kevin Rahm as Tim
Larry Poindexter as Darrell
Joy Gohring as Glory
Jacleen Haber as Rachel
Shani Wallis as Voice of Greta

Awards
In 2006 and 2007, the film won these awards:
HDFest 2006: "Best Directing in an HD Feature", "Best High-Definition Feature", "Best Screenplay in an HD Feature"
Kansas International Film Festival 2006: "Audience Award"
Stony Brook Film Festival 2006: "Best Feature"
Valley Film Festival 2006: "10 Degrees Hotter Award"
Wine Country Film Festival 2006: "Best Independent Feature Under $100,000"
Oxford International Film Festival 2007: "Audience Award: Best *Narrative Feature"
Del Ray Beach Film Festival "Best Feature 2006"
Real To Reel Film Festival 2007 "Jury Award Best Feature"
Evil City Film Festival 2007 "Best Screenplay"
Palm Springs Film Festival 2007 "Best of Fest List"
Santa Fe Film Festival 2007 "Best of Southwest"
First Glance Hollywood FF 2006 "Third Place Feature"
Seattle True Independent Film Festival 2007 "Best use of Mike Damone"

References

External links
Official site for the movie

2006 films
2006 drama films
Films directed by John Putch
American drama films
Films shot in the Mojave Desert
2000s English-language films
2000s American films